WVAF (99.9 FM) is an adult contemporary radio station in the Charleston, West Virginia, market area. The station broadcasts with an ERP of 24,500 watts. WVAF is ranked third in the Arbitron ratings for the Charleston Metropolitan Statistical Area market, and is currently owned by WVRC Media.

History
WVAF's license was granted on December 24, 1963, but it did not sign on until February 1, 1965. 
Although V100 has broadcast the AC format for most of its existence, it has dabbled in other formats.  It was previously a rock station thru most of the 1970’s, and in the late 1990’s took on a Current Hit/Top 40 format until early 2000.

It was also previously owned by Capital Broadcasting Corporation and was the FM sister of WCAW-AM 680 until it was sold to West Virginia Radio Corporation. In the late 1990s, V100 played songs from the 70s such as Elton John & Kiki Dee's "Don't Go Breaking My Heart", Eagles' "Hotel California", Bee Gees "Stayin' Alive" and many more. By 2013, V100 dropped all 70's songs from their playlist and started to focus on more of a hot AC format without the hard rock or rap. It averages two or three songs from the 80s an hour, with mostly 90s, 2000s and current hits. Today, V100 has added the Eagles song, "Hotel California" back into the playlist.

The All 80's Lunch with Steve Bishop is broadcast on weekdays at noon and plays music from 1980 to 1989. The John Tesh Radio Show is broadcast early Sunday mornings from 4 am to 9 am. Backtrax USA with Kidd Kelly (the 80's and 90's versions) is broadcast from 8 pm to midnight on Saturdays, and Tom Kent's radio program Lovin Life Livin The '80s from 7 pm to midnight on Sundays. On Sunday, the station broadcasts Sonrise from 9am to 11am.

References

External links
V-100 WVAF official website

History of WVAF and WCAW

VAF-FM
Mainstream adult contemporary radio stations in the United States